A successive-approximation ADC is a type of analog-to-digital converter that converts a continuous analog waveform into a discrete digital representation using a binary search through all possible quantization levels before finally converging upon a digital output for each conversion.

Algorithm 
The successive-approximation analog-to-digital converter circuit typically consists of four chief subcircuits:
 A sample-and-hold circuit to acquire the input voltage .
 An analog voltage comparator that compares  to the output of the internal DAC and outputs the result of the comparison to the successive-approximation register (SAR).

The successive approximation register is initialized so that the most significant bit (MSB) is equal to a digital 1. This code is fed into the DAC, which then supplies the analog equivalent of this digital code  into the comparator circuit for comparison with the sampled input voltage. If this analog voltage exceeds , then the comparator causes the SAR to reset this bit; otherwise, the bit is left as 1. Then the next bit is set to 1 and the same test is done, continuing this binary search until every bit in the SAR has been tested. The resulting code is the digital approximation of the sampled input voltage and is finally output by the SAR at the end of the conversion (EOC).

The algorithm proceeds as follows:
 Initial approximation .
It follows using mathematical induction that .

As shown in the above algorithm, a SAR ADC requires:
 An input voltage source .
 A reference voltage source  to normalize the input.
 A DAC to convert the  approximation  to a voltage.
 A comparator to perform the function  by comparing the DAC's voltage with the input voltage.
 A register to store the output of the comparator and apply .

Example: The ten steps to converting an analog input to 10 bit digital, using successive approximation, are shown here for all voltages from 5 V to 0 V in 0.1 V iterations. Since the reference voltage is 5 V, when the input voltage is also 5 V, all bits are set. As the voltage is decreased to 4.9 V, only some of the least significant bits are cleared. The MSB will remain set until the input is one half the reference voltage, 2.5 V.

The binary weights assigned to each bit, starting with the MSB, are 2.5, 1.25, 0.625, 0.3125, 0.15625, 0.078125, 0.0390625, 0.01953125, 0.009765625, 0.0048828125. All of these add up to 4.9951171875, meaning binary 1111111111, or one LSB less than 5. 

When the analog input is being compared to the internal DAC output, it effectively is being compared to each of these binary weights, starting with the 2.5 V and either keeping it or clearing it as a result. Then by adding the next weight to the previous result, comparing again, and repeating until all the bits and their weights have been compared to the input, the end result, a binary number representing the analog input, is found.

Variants
 Counter type ADC: The D to A converter can be easily turned around to provide the inverse function A to D conversion. The principle is to adjust the DAC's input code until the DAC's output comes within  LSB to the analog input which is to be converted to binary digital form.
 Servo tracking ADC: It is an improved version of a counting ADC. The circuit consists of an up-down counter with the comparator controlling the direction of the count. The analog output of the DAC is compared with the analog input. If the input is greater than the DAC output signal, the output of the comparator goes high and the counter is caused to count up. The tracking ADC has the advantage of being simple. The disadvantage, however, is the time needed to stabilize as a new conversion value is directly proportional to the rate at which the analog signal changes.

Charge-redistribution successive-approximation ADC

One of the most common implementations of the successive-approximation ADC, the charge-redistribution successive-approximation ADC, uses a charge-scaling DAC. The charge-scaling DAC simply consists of an array of individually switched binary-weighted capacitors. The amount of charge upon each capacitor in the array is used to perform the aforementioned binary search in conjunction with a comparator internal to the DAC and the successive-approximation register.

 The capacitor array is completely discharged to the offset voltage of the comparator, . This step provides automatic offset cancellation (i.e. the offset voltage represents nothing but dead charge, which can't be juggled by the capacitors).
 All of the capacitors within the array are switched to the input signal . The capacitors now have a charge equal to their respective capacitance times the input voltage minus the offset voltage upon each of them.
 The actual conversion process proceeds. Due to the binary-weighting of the array, the MSB capacitor forms a 1:1 charge divider with the rest of the array. Thus, the input voltage to the comparator is now . Each capacitor is tested in the same manner until the comparator input voltage converges to the offset voltage, or at least as close as possible given the resolution of the DAC.

Use with non-ideal analog circuits 
When implemented as an analog circuit – where the value of each successive bit is not perfectly  (e.g. 1.1, 2.12, 4.05, 8.01, etc.) – a successive-approximation approach might not output the ideal value because the binary search algorithm incorrectly removes what it believes to be half of the values the unknown input cannot be. Depending on the difference between actual and ideal performance, the maximal error can easily exceed several LSBs, especially as the error between the actual and ideal  becomes large for one or more bits. Since the actual input is unknown, it is therefore very important that accuracy of the analog circuit used to implement a SAR ADC be very close to the ideal  values; otherwise, it cannot guarantee a best match search.

See also 
 Quantization noise
 Digital-to-analog converter

References

Further reading
 CMOS Circuit Design, Layout, and Simulation, 3rd Edition; R. J. Baker; Wiley-IEEE; 1208 pages; 2010; 
 Data Conversion Handbook; Analog Devices; Newnes; 976 pages; 2004;

External links 
 Understanding SAR ADCs: Their Architecture and Comparison with Other ADCs - Maxim
 Choose the right A/D converter for your application - TI

Electronic circuits
Digital signal processing
Analog circuits
Approximations